Feel is a studio album by former Deep Purple, Black Sabbath and Trapeze vocalist and bassist Glenn Hughes. It was released in 1995 on Zero Corporation and SPV records and was Hughes' fourth solo studio album.

History
Feel is an album Hughes claims he made for himself, as he was "tired of being told what to do". It is distinctive to Hughes' other work in that the album has more of a pop, soul and funk sound rather than the hard rock he is generally known for.

This album marks the first collaboration between Hughes and Pat Thrall since the 1982 Hughes/Thrall album, Thrall plays guitar on eight of the thirteen tracks and co-wrote two of them. Also performing on the album are former Guns N' Roses and Velvet Revolver drummer Matt Sorum, former Stevie Wonder keyboardist Greg Phillinganes and guitarists Bruce Gowdy and George Nastos.

This is the first solo studio album Hughes made that featured his bass playing on every track since 1977's Play Me Out.

Feel features a cover of the Stevie Wonder song "Maybe Your Baby" from Talking Book. The Japanese version of the album also includes a new recording of the Deep Purple track "Holy Man", which was originally released on Stormbringer.

Track listing
"Big Time" – 4:59 (Hughes, Thrall)
"Livin' For The Minute" – 5:26 (Gowdy, Hughes)
"Does It Mean That Much To You?" – 5:42 (Hughes)
"Save Me Tonight (I'll Be Waiting)" – 4:15 (Hughes, Kentis, Rojas)
"Redline" – 4:53 (Hughes, Thrall)
"Coffee & Vanilla" – 5:59 (Hughes, Rojas)
"Push!" – 4:56 (Hughes)
"She Loves Your Money" – 4:38 (Allison, Gowdy, Hughes)
"Speak Your Mind" – 5:17 (Hughes, Rojas)
"Talkin' To Messiah" – 4:38 (Gowdy, Hughes)
"Maybe Your Baby" – 5:43 (Wonder)

Japanese bonus track
"Holy Man" – 4:20 (Coverdale, Hughes, Lord)

Personnel 

 Glenn Hughes – vocals, bass guitar
 Pat Thrall – guitars, keyboards (1, 3–8, 11)
 Bruce Gowdy – guitars, keyboards (2, 10)
 George Nastos – guitars (8, 9, 11, 12)
 Gary Ferguson – drums (all except 10)
 Matt Sorum – drums (10)
 Todd Hunter – keyboards (1, 3–5)
 Marc Hugenberger – keyboards (3, 4, 6–9, 12)
 Carmine Rojas – Keyboards (6, 9)
 Greg Phillinganes – keyboards (11)
 Pat Zicari – saxophone (4, 6, 8)
 Guy Allison – bass synthesizer (8)

References

External links
"Feel" at glennhughes.com

1995 albums
Glenn Hughes albums